Alan Paul Krasnoff is a Republican former mayor of Chesapeake, Virginia. Chesapeake is located on the Eastern part of Virginia. Krasnoff had served as Mayor of Chesapeake from 2008 until 2017.

References

External links
Mayor Alan P. Krasnoff - City of Chesapeake, Virginia

Living people
Mayors of Chesapeake, Virginia
Queens College, City University of New York alumni
Virginia city council members
Virginia Republicans
Year of birth missing (living people)
21st-century American politicians